American Empire is a 1942 American Western film directed by William C. McGann. The film was released in the United Kingdom as My Son Alone.

Plot 
Three Civil War vets head to Texas and build a cattle empire, and battle rustlers, bad weather and each other. The first man abandons ship, and he is soon followed by the second partner. That leaves the "good guy" to defend his property from the vengeful traitors.

Cast 

 Richard Dix as Dan Taylor
 Leo Carrillo as Dominique Beauchard
 Preston Foster as Paxton Bryce
 Frances Gifford as Abigail 'Abby' Taylor, Dan's Sister
 Robert Barrat as Crowder, Small Rancher
 Jack La Rue as Pierre, Beauchard Henchman
 Guinn "Big Boy" Williams as Sailaway
 Cliff Edwards as Runty
 Merrill Rodin as Paxton Bryce Jr.
 Chris-Pin Martin as Augustin, Beauchard Henchman
 Richard Webb as Crane (small rancher)
 William Farnum as Louisiana Judge
 Etta McDaniel as Willa May, Bryce's Maid
 Hal Taliaferro as Malone

Soundtrack 
 Cliff Edwards – "Little Pal" (Written by Lew Pollack)

References

External links 
 
 

1942 films
American black-and-white films
1942 Western (genre) films
Paramount Pictures films
American Western (genre) films
Films directed by William C. McGann
1940s English-language films
1940s American films